The Frank was the currency of the Swiss canton of Schwyz between 1798 and 1850. It was subdivided into 10 Batzen, each of 10 Rappen (also spelled Rapen) or 20 Angster. It was worth th the French silver écu or 6.67 g fine silver.

History

The Frank was the currency of the Helvetian Republic from 1798, replacing the Gulden in Schwyz. The Helvetian Republic ceased issuing coins in 1803. Schwyz issued coins between 1810 and 1846. In 1850, the Swiss franc was introduced, with 1 Schwyz Frank = 1.4597 Swiss francs.

Coins
Copper coins were issued in denominations of 1 Angster and 1 Rappen, with billon coins for 2 Rappen,  and 2 Batzen, and silver 4 Batzen.

References

External links

Modern obsolete currencies
Currencies of Switzerland
1810s establishments in Switzerland
1850 disestablishments in Switzerland
Currencies of Europe